Polygonum ciliinode (synonym Fallopia ciliinodis) is a species of flowering plant in the family Polygonaceae, native to central and eastern Canada, and the north-central and eastern United States. The specific epithet is also spelt cilinode.

Taxonomy
The species was first described by André Michaux in 1803. Michaux spelt the epithet "cilinode". Article 60 of the International Code of Nomenclature for algae, fungi, and plants requires the correction of improperly formed "compounding forms", and the International Plant Names Index has corrected it to "ciliinode".

Polygonum ciliinode is part of the tribe Polygoneae of the subfamily Polygonoideae.  However, like many species in the family Polygonaceae, it has been placed in different genera within this group, including in Fallopia and Reynoutria. A 2015 molecular phylogenetic study (in which the species was treated as Fallopia cilinodis) found that it was weakly supported as a sister to the "DAP clade" (see the following cladogram), although plastid data alone placed it in the "RMF clade". The presence of extra-floral nectaries in Polygonum ciliinode suggests a relationship with the RMF clade, as this is one of the characteristics of the clade. Its relationships remain unsettled; it may represent an as-yet-unrecognized lineage in the Polygoneae.

References

ciliinode
Flora of Western Canada
Flora of Eastern Canada
Flora of the North-Central United States
Flora of the Northeastern United States
Flora of the Southeastern United States
Plants described in 1803
Flora without expected TNC conservation status